Lots of Luck is a 1985 American made-for-television comedy film produced by Walt Disney Television starring Martin Mull and Annette Funicello, directed by Peter Baldwin. The film originally aired February 3, 1985 on the Disney Channel.

It was Funicello's first film for Disney since The Monkey's Uncle (1965).

Plot 
The film focuses on a blue-collar family who wins the lottery. Their lives are changed forever, sometimes for the good, sometimes for the bad.

Cast
Martin Mull as Frank Maris
Annette Funicello as Julie Maris
Fred Willard as A.J. Foley
Polly Holliday as Lucille
Mia Dillon as Jessie Foley
Tracey Gold as Cindy Maris
Jeremy Licht as David Maris
Christina Nigra as Trish Maris
Lonnie Burr as Sid

References

External links

1985 television films
1985 films
1985 comedy films
American comedy films
Disney Channel original films
Films directed by Peter Baldwin (director)
1980s American films